Lake Charlotte or Charlotte Lake may refer to:
 Charlotte Lake (British Columbia)
 Charlotte Lake (California)
 Lake Charlotte, Nova Scotia, a lake and a community in the Halifax Regional Municipality, Nova Scotia
 Lake Charlotte (Florida), a lake in Highlands County, Florida
 Lake Charlotte (Martin County, Minnesota) 
 Charlotte Lake (Todd County, Minnesota)
 Lake Charlotte (Wright County, Minnesota) 
 Lake Charlotte, India, a lake in Matheran, India